Norelona  is a monospecific genus of air-breathing land snail, a terrestrial pulmonate gastropod mollusk in the family Elonidae.

Species
 Norelona pyrenaica (Draparnaud, 1805)

References

 Nordsieck, H. (1986). Das System der tertiären Helicoidea Mittel- und Westeuropas (Gastropoda: Stylommatophora). Heldia. 1(4): 109-120.
 Bank, R. A. (2017). Classification of the Recent terrestrial Gastropoda of the World. 

Elonidae